Terter Peak is an ice-covered peak rising to 570 m in Breznik Heights, Greenwich Island in the South Shetland Islands, Antarctica surmounting Wulfila Glacier to the southwest, Solis Glacier to the northwest and Zheravna Glacier to the southeast.

Location

The peak is named after Czar Svetoslav Terter of Bulgaria, 1300-1321 AD.

Maps
 L.L. Ivanov et al. Antarctica: Livingston Island and Greenwich Island, South Shetland Islands. Scale 1:100000 topographic map. Sofia: Antarctic Place-names Commission of Bulgaria, 2005.
 L.L. Ivanov. Antarctica: Livingston Island and Greenwich, Robert, Snow and Smith Islands. Scale 1:120000 topographic map.  Troyan: Manfred Wörner Foundation, 2009.

References
 Terter Peak. SCAR Composite Gazetteer of Antarctica
 Bulgarian Antarctic Gazetteer. Antarctic Place-names Commission. (details in Bulgarian, basic data in English)

External links
 Terter Peak. Copernix satellite image

Mountains of Greenwich Island